Little Boy Blue is an ITV drama series, shown over four sixty-minute episodes from 24 April to 15 May 2017. The series focuses on the murder of Rhys Jones in Croxteth, Liverpool in 2007.

Cast
Stephen Graham – Detective Superintendent Dave Kelly
Sinead Keenan – Melanie Jones
Brían F. O'Byrne – Steve Jones
Faye McKeever – Claire Olssen
 Sonny Beyga – Rhys Jones
 Matthew Roberts – Owen Jones
Stephen Walters – DCI Mark Guinness
Grant Crookes - Detective Constable 
Christine Tremarco – Marie Thompson
 Sara Powell – Assistant Chief Constable Pat Gallan
 Michael Moran – Kevin Moody
 Nathan Clark Smith – Jordan Olssen
 James Nelson-Joyce – James Yates
 Paddy Rowan – Sean Mercer
Jack McMullen – Dean Kelly

Production
Stephen Graham was cast as Detective Superintendent Dave Kelly and Sinead Keenan and Brían F. O'Byrne were cast as Melanie and Steve Jones, respectively in a new four-part drama titled Little Boy Blue. On 18 April 2017, it was confirmed that the programme would begin its broadcasting on 24 April 2017 on a weekly basis, concluding on 15 May.

Episodes
Little Boy Blue aired in four sixty-minute episodes. Whilst filming took place in Liverpool, the murder scene itself was filmed outside Liverpool as a sign of respect for his parents. However locations used in Liverpool include the Anglican Cathedral and Liverpool Crown Court.

References

External links

Little Boy Blue at ITV Hub
Production website at ITV Studios

2017 British television series debuts
2017 British television series endings
2010s British crime television series
2010s British drama television series
British crime drama television series
2010s British television miniseries
English-language television shows
ITV television dramas
Television series by ITV Studios
Television series set in 2007
Television shows set in Liverpool